Ferdinand of Portugal, Duke of Guarda, (5 June 1507 – 7 November 1534;) was a Portuguese infante (prince), the son of King Manuel I of Portugal and his second wife, Maria of Aragon.

Biography 
Ferdinand was born in Abrantes on 5 June 1507. At birth, he was made Duke of Guarda by his father. He was also Lord of Alfaiates, Sabugal and Abrantes, and Mayor of Trancoso, Lamego and Marialva.

In 1530 he married Guiomar Coutinho, 5th Countess of Marialva and 3rd Countess of Loulé, a rich heiress from a Portuguese noble family. The marriage was arranged by King John III of Portugal, Ferdinand's older brother. The couple settled in Abrantes, where their two children were born: a daughter, Luisa (born in 1531), and a son, born on 1 August 1533, who died shortly after his birth.

Luisa, his only surviving child, died in October 1534.  Ferdinand himself died one month later, on 7 November 1534, in Abrantes.  He is buried in the Church of Saint Dominique of Abrantes.  His widow, Guiomar Coutinho, died one month later, on 9 December.

Ancestry

See also
Duke of Guarda
Count of Loulé
Count of Marialva
Descendants of Manuel I of Portugal

Notes

1507 births
1534 deaths
House of Aviz
Portuguese infantes
1
People from Abrantes
16th-century Portuguese people
Sons of kings